Alexandre-Théophile Vandermonde (28 February 1735 – 1 January 1796) was a French mathematician, musician, and chemist who worked with Bézout and Lavoisier; his name is now principally associated with determinant theory in mathematics. He was born in Paris, and died there.

Biography
Vandermonde was a violinist, and became engaged with mathematics only around 1770. In Mémoire sur la résolution des équations (1771) he reported on symmetric functions and solution of cyclotomic polynomials; this paper anticipated later Galois theory (see also abstract algebra for the role of Vandermonde in the genesis of group theory). In Remarques sur des problèmes de situation (1771) he studied knight's tours, and presaged the development of knot theory by explicitly noting the importance of topological features when discussing the properties of knots:

"Whatever the twists and turns of a system of threads in space, one can always obtain an expression for the calculation of its dimensions, but this expression will be of little use in practice. The craftsman who fashions a braid, a net, or some knots will be concerned, not with questions of measurement, but with those of position: what he sees there is the manner in which the theads are interlaced"

The same year he was elected to the French Academy of Sciences. Mémoire sur des irrationnelles de différents ordres avec une application au cercle (1772) was on combinatorics, and Mémoire sur l'élimination (1772) on the foundations of determinant theory. These papers were presented to the Académie des Sciences, and constitute all his published mathematical work. The Vandermonde determinant does not make an explicit appearance.

He was professor at the École Normale Supérieure, member of the Conservatoire national des arts et métiers and examiner at the École polytechnique.

Honors 
 A special class of matrices, the Vandermonde matrices are named after him, as is an elementary fact of combinatorics, Vandermonde's identity.
 Vandermonde is the secret society of the Conservatoire National des Arts et Métiers.

See also 
Knight's Tour
Knot theory
Vandermonde's identity
Vandermonde polynomial
Vandermonde matrix

Notes

Further reading 
 Gilbert Faccarello, Du Conservatoire à l'Ecole Normale, Les cahiers d'histoire du CNAM, 2-3, 17-57, CNAM, Paris, 1993. 
 Jacqueline Hecht, Un exemple de multidisciplinarité : Alexandre Vandermonde (1735-1796), Population, 4, 641-676, INED, Paris, 1971.

External links
 

1735 births
1796 deaths
Scientists from Paris
18th-century French mathematicians
Linear algebraists
Combinatorialists
Members of the French Academy of Sciences